William Carr Corbitt (March 8, 1854 – April 22, 1922) was an American Democratic politician who served as a member of the Virginia Senate from 1915 until his death in 1922.

References

External links

1854 births
1922 deaths
Democratic Party Virginia state senators
Politicians from Suffolk, Virginia
20th-century American politicians